The 2011 AMA National Speedway Championship Series was staged over a single round, which was held at Auburn on September 30. Billy Janniro took the title, his third in total, scoring a maximum in the process.

Event format 
Over the course of 20 heats, each rider raced against every other rider once. The top eight scorers then reached the semi-finals, with first and second in those semi-finals reaching the final. The final counted for double points, with the overall positions decided upon the total points scored in the meeting.

Classification 
30 September 2011
 Auburn

References 

AMA
United States
Speed
Speed